is a Japanese manga series written and illustrated by Satoshi Shiki, published in Kodansha's Monthly Afternoon magazine from 1997 to 2003.

A 2-CD audio drama based on the manga was released on December 26, 2003.  An English translation of all seven volumes of the manga was released by Tokyopop between February 2006 and February 2008.

Plot 
One thousand years ago, 88 beasts descended upon Earth, threatening humanity. Five elemental warriors, the pure-blood members of the mystical tribes of the Matsurowanu  stood before the beasts. Just as they were being sent down into a dimensional prison, the Beasts cursed the warriors of Sky, Wind and Fire, so one day their descendants will be lured into freeing the Beasts, granting the demons another chance at destroying mankind.

In present-day Japan, the cursed descendants turn their backs on the warriors of Earth and Water and seek the gates to the dimensional prison that hold the 88 Beasts. The story follows Mikogami Misao, the "Maiden of Water", whose blood can unlock the prison that holds the fabled 88 Beasts, and Ishigami Kamuro, the Warrior of Earth.

Characters

Descendants of the Kegai no Tami

Water 

Misao is an orphan living in a nunnery with kindly women. She is the "Maiden of Water", whose blood can bring back the 88 beasts who were banished 1,000 years ago. Because of this, she is wanted by the Shiranami five. Misao wants to be friends with "Sakurai" (Aiguma), who everyone believes is scary and psychotic. Misao is a timid, naive, but kind girl who often lived her life the way she thought it is appropriate. But when Ishigami comes forward asking for her help to stop the resurrection of the 88 Beasts, for the first time Misao speaks up on her own, and this gives her new sense of confidence and inner strength that she had kept locked away in her for so long. In addition, the "true" self, Misao the Girl of Water, seemed to have awakened as a result of the newfound strength, and she will not hesitate to unleash her fury upon those who crosses her.

 (Drama CD)

Mikogami Sae
The former chief of Mizu No Tami tribe and grandmother to Misao. She explains to Misao about the impending conflict among the Kegai No Tami tribes over the resurrection of the 88 Beasts, and that she is the only one left with the capabilities of the Mizu therefore she must become the next Chief of her tribe. She is killed by Kaede in Volume 3.

Earth 

The Man of Earth, a mysterious warrior who is a part of the Kegai no Tami. He was born with a stone in his hand, which he claims helps him to heighten his combat instincts, along with closing his eyes. He has also said he has yet to find an opponent who can exceed his instincts, but later finds this opponent in the form of Higa-sama. Afterwards Ishigami gives the stone to Misao, as a reminder of her promise to fight at his side. Ishigami wields the legendary Kamikaze, a katana passed down through generations of the Earth tribe.

 (Drama CD)

Ishigami Daidara
The previous chief of the Chi and grandfather of Kamuro. After the Shiranami Five sacked the Chi village and annihilated the inhabitants, Daidara tells Kamuro to kill him so that he can become stronger to stop the rival Kegai No Tamis from resurrecting the Beasts.

Aida
A high school student and one of the few Chi No Tami left. He emerges as the Kegai No Tami Hunter, pursuing and executing any and all Fire and Wind warriors.

Fire 

The Man of Fire and one of the cursed descendants of the Kegai No Tami bent on freeing the 88 Beasts. He is cold-hearted and boastful of his strengths at first, but by Volume 5 he has been released from the Beasts' spell and joins Kamuro and Misao on their quest to stop the Beasts' conquest of the world.  He is also the father of Zen, a young boy who is the key to saving the world.

 (Drama CD)

Wind 

The Lady of Wind and the wife of Higa. She has powers over Wind, and she is steadfast on her duty as Chief of Kaze No Tami to protect her clan, and will go over great lengths to do so. It is suggested that Kaede is a lesbian, forcing her subordinate, Aiguma, to sleep with her. After giving her blood to the Wind Torii she became more docile and eventually realizes her faults in resurrecting the 88 Beasts.

 (Drama CD)

Zen
The son of Higa and Kaede, he represents the positive force in opposition to Kayano's negative energy.  He also has powers of his own that matches Kayano.

Sky 
Kayano
The chief of the Utsuho no Tami. He dissolved the hypnotic spell placed upon the Sky, Fire and Wind Clans which triggered the start of the resurrection of the 88 beasts.

The Amatsu Three 
The Amatsu Three are warriors under direct subordination to either Higa or Kaede.  They may also be part of the Kegai No Tami clans.

Known as "Sakurai" to her classmates. She works directly under Kaede, though half of the time she seems a bit afraid of her mistress, probably due to Kaede's sexual desires toward her. Whenever Aiguma fails a mission, Kaede punishes her by forcing them to sleep together.

A cocky young man with the ability to control fire.

 (Drama CD)

A middle-schooler with power over animals. She confides that she kills so there would be less humans to hurt the animals. She is abandoned by her group after a battle at school that went awry and left her seriously injured. She is tagging along with Ishigami though it is not certain if she has become his new ally. She also has a dog, Lancelot, who is also as vicious a killer as she is.

 (Drama CD)

Oba
A middle aged woman who manages the team. She has no powers but is strong and vicious, and carries a rifle.  She is like the mother figure of the group.

The Shiranami Five 
The Shiranami Five are supernatural warriors, also part of the Kegai No Tami, with demonic powers which was a result of genetic alteration with the cells of the 88 Beasts. They are Higa's henchmen.

Rihei
A loud mouthed freak with electronic arms that can slice a head off as easily as a sword as well as fire bullets and bombs.  He often wears goggles or mask, probably to hide his hideous face.  His past is not known at the moment.

Rikimaru
A deformed giant who speaks little and is wiser of the Five. His faith in the 88 beasts has wavered when he saw its true evil nature.

Kikunosuke
He is the self-proclaimed "Punk Goddess of Fortune". Kikunosuke was born with one hand in shape of a blade and as a result was rejected at birth and by his foster parents, hence his hatred for the humans.

Jyuzo
A man with ability to stretch his body parts into unusual proportions. He can also meld into the bodies of the Beasts and control them at his will.

Audio drama 
A Kamikaze Drama CD (ABCA-5030) was released on December 26, 2003.

External links 

1997 manga
Seinen manga